There & Here (From the Vaults, Series 4) is a double live album from American progressive rock band Spock's Beard. Individual songs were recorded at several shows on the V tours in Europe, as well as the August 2000 show at the Troubadour in Los Angeles. It was released in July 2001 on Radiant Records.

Track listing

Disc one
"Beware of Darkness" – 6:50
"Gibberish" – 5:10
"At the End of the Day" – 16:58
"Revelation" – 6:45
"All on a Sunday" – 4:15
"Thoughts (Part II)" – 5:01
"Harm's Way" – 12:33
"Ryo's Solo" – 10:03

Disc two
"The Great Nothing" – 26:38
"Medley: The Doorway, Mood for a Day, The Light, June" – 19:53
"Space Truckin'/Soul Sacrifice" – 4:56
"Whole Lotta Love/Waste Away" – 12:03

Personnel
Neal Morse – lead and backing vocals, guitar and keyboards
Nick D'Virgilio – drums and backing vocals
Dave Meros – bass guitar and backing vocals
Alan Morse – guitars and backing vocals
Ryo Okumoto – keyboards and backing vocals

External links
 Spock's Beard discography

Notes and references

Spock's Beard albums
2001 live albums